Haplochromis nubilus, the blue Victoria mouthbrooder, is a species of cichlid found in the Lake Victoria system in East Africa. It inhabits shallow areas near shores. It is omnivorous and feeds on algae, small crustaceans, and insect larvae.

Description 
Males are black during spawning with red anal and dorsal fins. Females have dull coloration consisting of brown and green shades. Dominant males become very aggressive and territorial when spawning. As with other cichlids, their life expectancy  is around 10 years.

See also 
 List of freshwater aquarium fish species

References 

Freshwater fish of Kenya
nubilus
Fish described in 1906
Taxonomy articles created by Polbot